Nick Stabile  (born March 4, 1971) is an American television and film actor. He is known for playing Jesse Miller in Bride of Chucky.

Career
Stabile played Gabe Capshaw on the show, Saints and Sinners. He is well known for playing the role of Jesse (Katherine Heigl's on-screen boyfriend) in the slasher film Bride of Chucky. He also played Mark Wolper on the now-defunct NBC soap Sunset Beach from the show's premiere in January 1997 until January 1998 when his character was killed off. In 2000, Stabile took on the role of Dennis Wilson in The Beach Boys: An American Family.  He played the lead role in Santa, Jr., a film released in 2002.  Stabile also portrayed the role of Nicholas Foxworth "Fox" Crane on another NBC soap, Passions on a temporary basis from August to September 2004. During this time, Justin Hartley (the original Fox) was on paternity leave with wife Lindsay Hartley.

He then played Dean Hartman on Days of Our Lives from June 2009 to September 2009. As of 2010, he has made appearances on The Real Housewives of Beverly Hills, notably with Camille Grammer, ex-wife of Kelsey Grammer.

On June 17, 2016, Stabile began portraying Nikolas Cassadine on General Hospital, temporarily filling in for Tyler Christopher, the other films such as Ben Schwartz, Macaulay Culkin, Jacob Tremblay, Dick Beals, Sonia Manzano, Gwen Stefani, John Murphy, Miko Hughes, Monica Keena, Cillian Murphy, Helena Bonham Carter, Robert Zemeckis, Jackie Earle Haley, and Christopher Thomas.

Personal life
In 2006, Stabile married actress Tricia Small.  They have a daughter, born in 2008.

Filmography

Film

Television

References

External links
 Official site (archived)
 

Living people
American male film actors
American male television actors
1971 births